The SVT drama Radioskugga follows radio host Alexander and the villagers in small town Bakvattnet.

Season 1: 1995

Season 2: 1997

External links 
IMDb entry

Lists of drama television series episodes